The 2006 China Open in badminton was held from October 17 to October 22, 2006 in Guangzhou, China.

The prize money was US$250,000.

Venue
Tianhe Gymnasium

Results

External links
 2006 Results
 2006 China Open at www.gzba.org
 

China Open
China Open
China Open (badminton)